Myriam François is a Franco-Irish journalist, filmmaker and writer. Her work has appeared on BBC, Channel 4, Al Jazeera. She is the founder and CEO of production company mpwr productions, which specialises in documentary films which center minoritised voices.

Biography 
Myriam François was born in Camden, London, to Irish and French parents. She attended a French school in London and is bilingual. She was born Emilie François, but changed her name when she became Muslim in 2004.

François was a child actress whose performance in Oscar-winning film Sense and Sensibility (1995) playing Margaret Dashwood earned her critical acclaim. She went on to appear in Paws (1997), alongside Billy Connolly and Nathan Cavaleri, and in New Years’s Day (2001).

Career
François is a former Research Associate at the Centre of Islamic Studies (CIS) at SOAS University. She completed her PhD (DPhil) at Oxford University, focusing on Islamic movements in Morocco, in 2017. She holds an MA from Georgetown University (USA) and a BA from Cambridge University (UK).

François began her career in documentary filmmaking as a presenter and producer at the BBC. Her first documentary, A Deadly Warning: Srebrenica Revisited (BBC1, 2015), was nominated for the Sandford St Martin Religious Programming Award in 2016. In 2016, she presented her second BBC1 documentary, The Muslim Pound (2016), which explores the growing consumer goods market for Muslims in the UK.

In 2017, François presented The Truth about Muslim marriage (Channel 4, 2017), which was nominated for Best Investigative Documentary at the Asian Media Awards in 2018.

In 2017, François joined TRTWold as Europe correspondent, covering European breaking news. Between 2017 and 2018, she also developed, produced and presented Compass, a monthly arts and culture documentary for TRT world, a global news network on Sky 519.

In 2019, François left TRTWorld and began working with BBC World Service, where she produced and presented a series of short documentaries, including Tariq Ramadan: #MeToo in the Muslim world (2018), and Is Brexit-voting Llanelli changing its mind? (2019) which looks at the impact of Brexit in Llanelli, a Leave-voting town in Wales. In 2019, her documentary City of Refuge, which examined the plight of Syrian refugees in Lebanon, aired on BBC Radio4 in April 2019 and on BBC World service in May 2019. In 2022, she presented the BBC World Service audio documentary When rape becomes a crime, which focuses on rape laws in Senegal.

In 2022, François also began hosting and producing The Big Picture: France in Focus, a four-part series for Al Jazeera English focused on the fault lines within French society.

Writing 
A former columnist at the New Statesman, François’ writing has featured in the British press, including The Guardian, TIME, Foreign Policy, The Telegraph, CNN online and Middle East Eye.

François is a former Senior Fellow at the Center for Global Policy (CGP think tank), where, between 2019 and 2020, she produced an in-depth report looking at the plight of European children of ISIS fighters in camps in Northern Syria, as well as an accompanying piece for Foreign Policy. She has been an outspoken critic of Islamophobia.

Filmography

 A Deadly Warning: Srebrenica Revisited, BBC1, 2015 (presenter)
 Srebrenica massacre - Explained in under 2 min, BBC News, 2015 (presenter)
 The Muslim pound, BBC1, 2016 (presenter)
 The Truth About Muslim Marriage, Channel 4, 2017 (presenter)
 Compass series, TRTWorld, 2018/19 - (presenter/ producer)
 Witnesses of Stone
 Crafting an Identity - 'Britishness' after Brexit
 Art against all odds
 Tariq Ramadan: The rock star scholar and the rape claims, BBC News, 2018 (presenter/ producer)
 City of refuge, BBCR4, 2019 (presenter/ producer)
 Is Brexit-voting Llaneli changing its mind?, BBC News, 2019 (presenter/ producer)
 When rape becomes a crime, BBCR4, 2022 (presenter/ producer)
 France in Focus series, Al Jazeera English, 2022 - (presenter/ producer)
 The Big Picture
 Flirting with the Far Right
 The legacy of colonialism in France
 Finding Aicha, BBC Our World/BBC Arabic/CBC, 2023 (director/ producer)

References

External links
Official website

21st-century British women writers
Alumni of the University of Cambridge
English Muslims
English former Christians
Converts to Islam from Roman Catholicism
English child actresses
English film actresses
English women journalists
English columnists
Georgetown University Graduate School of Arts and Sciences alumni
HuffPost writers and columnists
Living people
Place of birth missing (living people)
Academics of SOAS University of London
Actresses from London
Al Jazeera people
BBC television presenters
British women columnists
Channel 4 presenters
English expatriates in the United States
English people of French descent
English people of Irish descent
People from the London Borough of Camden
Turkish Radio and Television Corporation people
Television personalities from London
Writers from London
1982 births
20th-century English actresses
21st-century English women